This is a list of ACF Fiorentina players who have been inducted into the club's Hall of Fame.

History and regulations
ACF Fiorentina's Hall of Fame has been launched in 2012, resulting from a collaboration between ACF Fiorentina and Museo Fiorentina. Fiorentina has been the first Italian football club to launch such initiative.

The award is given to players, managers, sporting directors, staff members, and historical supporters who have significantly marked the club's history. The inductees are selected by Museo Fiorentina and voted by a jury elected by the Collegio del Marzocco. The recipient are rewarded with the Marzocco Viola award, a statuette designed by the artist Marco Cantini and made by the silversmith Federico Sassoli. Portraits of the recipients are also made by Claudio Sacchi.

The 2020 edition has been postponed due to the COVID-19 pandemic.

Hall of Fame

Players

Coaches

Executives

Ambassadors

See also
List of ACF Fiorentina players

Footnotes

References

External links

Hall of Fame
Halls of fame in Italy